The 1999 Acura Classic singles was the singles event of the twentieth edition of the third tournament in the US Open Series.

Lindsay Davenport was the defending champion, but she was defeated in the semifinals by Julie Halard-Decugis. Serena Williams then defeated Halard-Decugis in the final to win the title.

Seeds

Draw

Finals

Top half

Bottom half

Qualifying

Seeds

Qualifiers

Qualifying draw

First qualifier

Second qualifier

Third qualifier

Fourth qualifier

External links
 ITF tournament draws

Singles
Acura Classic - Singles